Belgrave Road is a street in the Pimlico area of London. It is situated in the city of Westminster and runs between Eccleston Bridge to the northwest and Lupus Street to the southeast.

The street and the adjacent area were developed by Thomas Cubitt in the 1840s, who considered it as dwellings for the middle class, as opposed to those he had developed in Belgravia for the more affluent. The widths of the properties were comparatively narrow. As a result, the area went into decline but has more recently improved in both appearance and use.

There are three green spaces along its length, which is only 750 metres long. These are Eccleston Square, Warwick Square, and St George's Square. 

Belgrave Road is the home of HM Passport Office and two private schools. For the most part, both sides of the road are terraced stucco-fronted houses, giving the street an appearance of elegance from a previous age. Many of these houses have been converted into hotels, some of which have combined three adjacent houses.  There are over twenty hotels in a street where the house numbers do not exceed 140. This gives rise to a very mobile population.  Except where Warwick Way crosses Belgrave Road, there are no shops, and even at this crossing there is only a small convenience store and a public house, the "Marquis of Westminster".

Its proximity to Victoria Station has made it a popular street for tourists.

Bibliography 
 Michael Leapman (editor), London — The evolution of a great city. Weidenfeld & Nicolson, 1989. .

References 

Streets in the City of Westminster
Pimlico